Cake is a 2018 Pakistani comedy drama film which is directed by Asim Abbasi. The film is produced by Sayed Zulfikar Abbas Bukhari (Zulfi Bukhari) and is a joint production by Asim Abbasi's United Kingdom-based production company Indus Talkies, and a Pakistani film production company ZAB Films. The film stars Sanam Saeed and Aamina Sheikh as lead characters alongside Adnan Malik in his film debut.

A five-part prologue webisodes short-series was also released on YouTube, focusing on the lives of Zara and Adnan in London. It was selected as the Pakistani entry for the Best Foreign Language Film at the 91st Academy Awards, but it was not nominated.

Cast
 Aamina Sheikh as Zareen
 Sanam Saeed as Zara
 Adnan Malik as Romeo
 Mikaal Zulfiqar as Shehryar
 Syed Mohammad Ahmed as Zareen's father
 Beo Zafar as Habiba
 Faris Khalid as Zain
 Hira Hussain as Sana
Gianbruno Spena as Adnan (Webisodes)

Production

Filming
The majority of the filming was done in Karachi, interior Sindh, and London.

In a first for Pakistani cinema, the climax scene of the film is a continuous 10 minute, one-take shot with no edits, spanning multiple rooms and multiple characters. In an interview, actress Aamina Sheikh who played Zareen, shared that experience ''That one-take scene was not only about the actors moving – it's about the lights, camera crew, location, frames and all the invisible figures. One-takes are not used in films often, worldwide, so this was quite an experience for us.''

Release

Promotions
The film is the first ever Pakistani film which had its premiere at Leicester Square, London with national and international media covering the Event. The cast of the film toured Bradford where they visited Radio Sangam, Odeon Cinema Leeds, Trafford Centre, Star City and various other places for film promotion.

Home media
The film was made available as video on demand on Netflix in May 2019.

Critical reception 
Cake was released all over Pakistan on 30 March 2018, with highly positive reviews from critics.

Areebah Shahid writing for Bolo Jawan praised the film's direction and the performances of the female protagonists, stating, "Cake stands tall among the films that Pakistan can rightly take pride in and showcase for a wider, international audience."

Mike Cahill of The Guardian gave it 4/5 stars. He praised Asim's debut: "Pakistani cinema has long struggled to match its Indian cousin’s commercial reach, but this impressive debut from Asim Abbasi feels like a sound bet, and even quietly revolutionary in places."

Shahjehan Saleem of Something Haute gave it 4.5/5 stars: "Cake shines as a prime example of acting, cinematography, great music, and impeccable direction assimilating into perfection on the silver screen."

Turyal Azam Khan for The Diplomat wrote, "The strong response to the film in its home country has sent an important message to the filmmakers of Pakistan: it is okay to experiment, break barriers and test the audience. The formula is risky and might not always work, but art has no boundaries and that is what Cake displays."

Rahul Aijaz of The Express Tribune gave it 4.5/5 stars. "One slice just won't be enough"

Box office 
The film was a hit at the box office, collecting around  worldwide .

Awards and nominations 
The film was showcased at the London Asian Film Festival, now known as the UK Asian Film Festival where it won Best Director for Asim Abbasi.

Soundtrack 

 
The film also featured "Piya Tu Ab To Aaja".

See also
 List of Pakistani films of 2018
 List of submissions to the 91st Academy Awards for Best Foreign Language Film
 List of Pakistani submissions for the Academy Award for Best Foreign Language Film

References

External links
 
 
 Soundtrack on Patari.pk

2010s Urdu-language films
Pakistani comedy-drama films
2018 films
2018 comedy-drama films
Pakistani mystery films
Urdu-language Pakistani films